The 2018 Brentwood Borough Council election took place on 3 May 2018 to elect members of Brentwood Borough Council in England. This was on the same day as other local elections.

Result Summary

Ward results

Brentwood North

Brentwood South

Brentwood West

Brizes & Doddinghurst

Herongate, Ingrave & West Horndon

Hutton Central

Hutton East

Hutton South

Ingatestone, Fryerning and Mountnessing

Pilgrims Hatch

Shenfield

South Weald

Warley

References

2018
2018 English local elections